Five cities made presentations to the IOC Session in Monte Carlo to host the 2000 Summer Olympics. The Games were awarded to Sydney, New South Wales, Australia, on 23 September 1993 at 18:17 UTC (8:17 pm in Monaco (UTC+02:00), 4:17 am in Sydney, 24 September 1993 (UTC+10:00)). The other cities were Beijing (China), Manchester (Great Britain), Berlin (Germany) and Istanbul (Turkey). 11 days earlier in a different process, Sydney had been chosen by the International Paralympic Committee to host the 2000 Summer Paralympics in Berlin, Germany.

Events
The Australian Olympic Committee originally contemplated either Melbourne or Brisbane as their preferred bidding host cities, but Sydney gained popular favor amongst AOC President John Coates, and others, having never been a host city, as they were the last Australian bidding cities. Brasilia, capital city of Brazil, and Milan, Italy, withdrew during the bidding process – Milan shortly after submitting its bid book, Brasilia following the visit by the IOC Inspection Group, which stated the city had substandard facilities. Tashkent, Uzbekistan, also put in a bid for the Games, in order to gain some recognition of that country's existence and new independence, but withdrew very early into the race.

Berlin was an early front-runner, hoping to cap the decade of German reconstruction and reunification by hosting the first Games of the new millennium. But the support of its bid was marred when anti-Olympic protesters marched through the city just four days before the final vote in Monaco claiming that the games would deny funds to further domestic reconstruction efforts. Manchester's bid book was thought strong, but with much regeneration in the city needed, and with a promotional video shown to the IOC depicting London landmarks such as Buckingham Palace and Tower Bridge, the bid was criticized heavily by the British media sighting that the city's bid was 'suffering from an identity crisis'. The impending announcement of the host city came down to a head-to-head between Sydney and Beijing with Manchester, Berlin and Istanbul ranked outsiders. With China's suppression of protests in Tiananmen Square in 1989 still fresh in the minds of many in the West, Human Rights Watch launched a major media campaign to influence members of the International Olympic Committee to vote against awarding the Games to Beijing on human rights grounds. The campaign was one of the earliest efforts to claim that Olympic hosts should meet human rights tests. This project was recycled in part for the 2002 Commonwealth Games bid in which Manchester won.   

IOC president Juan Antonio Samaranch thanked by name alphabetically the five competing cities before announcing the winning bid. Many Chinese in Beijing mistook his utterance of the city's name as an announcement that it had been awarded the Games, and widespread celebrations began. These were cut short just minutes later when images from Sydney came through, showing that an Australian city had won.

The International Paralympic Committee then awarded the 2000 Summer Paralympics to Sydney.

Investigations were later launched into the prior bidding process by some cities, finding that two African members of the IOC received US$35,000 each from Australian Olympic Committee President John Coates during the bidding process for Sydney's 2000 Summer Olympics. Prior to the 2000 Olympics bidding, the Australia Olympic Committee offered Africa's nations training scholarships to its athletes to train in Adelaide in the lead up to the Sydney Games. The visiting 400 athletes from 11 African nations and their coaches took part in the special Olympic Training Camp. Under the program, they received accommodation, meals, use of training facilities, local transport, and access to sports medicine experts. The Program provided $2 million in total to support the development of Africa's athletes and coaches who participated in the 2000 Olympic Games.

Reactions by Beijing
The Beijing loss to Sydney was seen as a "significant blow" to an "urgent political priority" of the Communist Party leadership having mounted the most vigorous 2000 Olympic games campaign of any nation. A win would "validate China's return to the international stage" after several years of diplomatic isolation following the 1989 Tiananmen Square crackdown.

Yet, there had been concerns raised about the Beijing bid: air pollution, overcrowded streets and mass transit. But Beijing saw political motivation critical to the bid's failure. U.S. politicians Tom Lantos and Bill Bradley had lobbied the I.O.C. Lantos said, "human rights and decency must prevail in a society before they have the privilege of hosting the Olympics".

As the news of the failed bid spread, university students in Beijing made plans to march on the American embassy in Beijing. Police presence was stepped up across Beijing university campuses to prevent the incident. Also, Chinese officials speculated that Beijing would boycott the 1996 Summer Olympics because of the failed bid. Before the vote, the US intelligence community reported that should Beijing lose the bid, the Chinese government would resume underground nuclear testing, despite the worldwide moratorium on the process. However, Beijing did none of these things and went on to successfully bid for and host the 2008 Summer Olympics.

Final selection

References

External links
The IOC Evaluation Report

Candidature files
 Beijing 2000 Summary
 Berlin 2000 Volume 1
 Berlin 2000 Volume 2.1
 Berlin 2000 Volume 2.2
 Berlin 2000 Volume 2.3
 Berlin 2000 Volume 2.4
 Berlin 2000 Volume 2.5
 Berlin 2000 Volume 2.6
 Berlin 2000 Volume 2.7
 Berlin 2000 Volume 3
 Manchester 2000 Volume 1
 Manchester 2000 Volume 2
 Manchester 2000 Volume 3

bids
2000 Summer Olympics bids
Summer Olympics bids
September 1993 events in Europe
Historical events in Monaco
1993 in Monaco